Têtes or Tetes may refer to:

Les Grosses Têtes, daily French radio program on the RTL French radio network
Les Têtes Brulées, Cameroonian band known for a mellow pop version of the bikutsi dance music
Les têtes interverties, 1957 French short film written and directed by Alejandro Jodorowsky
Têtes à claques, French-language humour website created in 2006
Têtes Raides, French folk rock group blending French poetry, theater, visual arts and the Big Top circus antics

fr:Têtes